Otto Grieg Tidemand (18 June 1921, Oslo – 10 June 2006,  Oslo) was a Norwegian politician for the Conservative Party. He served as Minister of Defence from 1965 to 1970 and Minister of Trade and Shipping from 1970 to 1971.

Military service
During the Second World War, he served as a fighter pilot with the Royal Norwegian Air Force from 1942 to 1946, after training at a flying school in Canada. He was posted to No. 332 Squadron RAF (known as the Norwegian Squadron). While a sergeant pilot under training in England on 8 June 1943, he crashlanded his training plane near Ellesmere, Shropshire but survived unhurt. He flew Spitfires on offensive sweeps in Northwestern Europe and was credited with destroying one German Focke-Wulf Fw 190 and sharing in the downing of a Messerschmitt 410.

Political career
From 1965 to 5 June 1970 he served as the Minister of Defence during the Per Borten cabinet. On that date, he was appointed Minister of Trade and Shipping, which he held until the Borten cabinet fell in 1971.

Business career
He held numerous board memberships in Norwegian corporations, notably serving as chairman of the board of Saga Petroleum (1972-1976), Atlas Copco Norway (1978-1997), Vesta Hygea (1984-1986), Fina Norway (1981-1996) and Store Norske Spitsbergen Kulkompani (1982-1987). He was a member of the Steering Committee of the Bilderberg Group and participated in all their yearly conferences between 1967 and 1980 as well as in 1982 and 1984.

Decorations
Haakon VII 70th Anniversary Medal 1943
Distinguished Flying Cross (United Kingdom) 1944
War Medal (Norway) 1944
St. Olav's Medal with Oak Branch 1945
Defence Medal 1940-1945 1945
Order of Merit of the Federal Republic of Germany 1970
Commander of the Order of the Polar Star (Sweden) (first class) 1990
Commander of the Order of Leopold (Belgium) 1997

Sports interests
Tidemand was president of the Norwegian Golf Federation from 1962 to 1965.

References

1921 births
2006 deaths
Conservative Party (Norway) politicians
Ministers of Trade and Shipping of Norway
Politicians from Oslo
Members of the Steering Committee of the Bilderberg Group
20th-century Norwegian businesspeople
Norwegian aviators
Royal Norwegian Air Force personnel of World War II
Norwegian World War II pilots
Norwegian Royal Air Force pilots of World War II
Grand Crosses with Star and Sash of the Order of Merit of the Federal Republic of Germany
Norwegian expatriates in Canada
Defence ministers of Norway